Andrei Vartic (October 21, 1948, Dănceni – June 2, 2009, Chişinău) was a writer, physicist, and politician from Moldova.

Biography
Andrei Vartic graduated from Moldova State University in 1971. He was a founder of the Democratic Movement of Moldova and served as member of the Parliament of Moldova. He was the founder and the director of the magazines "Quo Vadis", "Fără Machiaj", and "Dava International".

On June 10, he became the first Vice-President of the Democratic Forum of Romanians in Moldova. He was Program director at Vocea Basarabiei.

Awards
 Andrei Vartic received post mortem the "Valeriu Cupcea" Prize from Boris Focşa in 2009.

Works
 Cealaltă Românie, 2007
 Întrebarea cu privire la paleoinformatică, 2006
 Arhelologia paravanului de la Ripiceni - Izvor, 2003
 Purificarea istoriei din oglinda scenei, 2002
 O istorie geometrică a lui Homo Sapiens, 2000
 Variaţiuni pe o temă de Levi-Strauss, 2000
 Rolist Eneas Ner Eneat, 1999
 Weg und WWW. A Portret of the World with Heidegger, 1999
 Kobayashi against Basho, 1999
 Introducere la pictură, 1998
 Drumul spre Kogaionon, 1998
 Magistralele tehnologice ale civilizaţiei dacice, 1997
 Fierul-Piatra, Dacii-Timpul, 1997
 Catastrofa eliberării, 1996
 Ospeţele Nemuririi, 1994
 Paravanul dintre actor şi rol,1980
 Ion, 1976
 Scrisori din Bizanţ, 1975
 Arta iubirii, 1974
 Pod peste fluviu, 1973
 Drum prin rime, 1972

Selected bibliography
Vartic, Andrei. Arheologia paravanului de la Risipeni - Izvor / Andrei Vartic. – Chişinău: Museum,2003.– 96 p.
Vartic, Andrei. Arta iubirii / Andrei Vartic. – [S. l., s.n.], 1974. – (Ediţie „samizdat”).
Vartic, Andrei. Basarabia, rana de la hotarul de est / Andrei Vartic. – Sibiu: Ed. Univ. "Lucian Blaga" din Sibiu, 2008. – 42 p.
Vartic, Andrei. Basarabia, rana de la hotarul de est / Andrei Vartic; Povara şi osânda orgoliului / Nicolae Rusu. – Bacău: Vicovia, 2008. – 107 p. – (Contrast).
Vartic, Andrei. Catastrofa eliberării / Andrei Vartic. – Chişinău: Ed. Basarabia, 1996. – 247 p.
Vartic, Andrei. Cealaltă Românie: [Publicistică] / Andrei Vartic. – Ploieşti: Casa de presă Typodas Press, 2007. – 384 p.
Vartic, Andrei. Drum prin rime / Andrei Vartic. - [S. l., s.n.], 1972. – (Ediţie „samizdat”).
Vartic, Andrei. Drumul spre Kagaion / Andrei Vartic. – Chişinău: Ed. Basarabia, 1998. – 274 p.
Vartic, Andrei. Fierul - Piatra, Dacii - Timpul / Andrei Vartic. – Chişinău, Ed. Basarabia, 1997. – 216 p.
Vartic, Andrei. Introducere la pictură / Andrei Vartic. – Chişinău, Ed. Basarabia, 1998. – 106 p.
Vartic, Andrei. Ion / Andrei Vartic. – [S. l., s.n.], 1976. – (Ediţie „samizdat”).
Vartic, Andrei. Întrebarea cu privire la paleoinformatică / Andrei Vartic. – Chişinău: Ed. BNRM, 2006. – 216 p.
Vartic, Andrei. Jurnal baltic Andrei Vartic. – [S. l., s.n.], 1978. – (Ediţie „samizdat”).
Vartic, Andrei. Lupta cu moartea / Andrei Vartic. – [S. l., s.n.], 1979. – (Ediţie „samizdat”).
Vartic, Andrei. Magistralele tehnologice ale civilizaţiei dacice / Andrei Vartic. – Chişinău: Ed. Basarabia, 1997. -  72  p.
Vartic, Andrei. O istorie geometrică a lui Homo Sapiens / Andrei Vartic. – Chişinău: Ed. Dava Internaţional, 2000. - 164 p.
Vartic, Andrei. Ospeţele nemuririi / Andrei Vartic. – Chişinău: Ed. Quo Vadis, 1994.
Vartic, Andrei. Paravanul dintre actor şi rol / Andrei Vartic. – Ed. a 2-a.- Chişinău: Ed. Basarabia, 1997. -  103  p.
Vartic, Andrei. Paravanul dintre actor şi rol / Andrei Vartic. – [Ed. a 1-a]. – [S. l., s.n.], 1980. – (Ediţie „samizdat”).
Vartic, Andrei. Pod peste fluviu / Andrei Vartic. – [S. l., s.n.], 1974. – (Ediţie „samizdat”).
Vartic, Andrei. Purificarea istoriei din oglinda scenei: O mizanscenă de la 2002 în opera lui I.L. Caragiale / Andrei Vartic. – Chişinău: Ed. Basarabia, 2002. – 119 p.
Vartic, Andrei. [Mircea] Snegur / Andrei Vartic. – Chişinău: Ed. Basarabia, 1996. -  254 p.
Vartic, Andrei. Scrisori din Bizanţ / Andrei Vartic. – [S. l., s.n.], 1975. – (Ediţie „samizdat”).
Vartic, Andrei. Variaţiuni pe o temă de Levi-Strauss   / Andrei Vartic. – Chişinău: Ed. Dava Internaţional, 2000. -  129 p.
  * * * 
Vartic, Andrei. Kobayashi Against Basho / Andrei Vartic. – Chişinău: Ed. Basarabia, 1999. - 180  p.
Vartic, Andrei. Rolist Eneas Ner Eneat / Andrei Vartic. – Chişinău: Ed. Basarabia, 1999. - 119    p.
Vartic, Andrei. Weg und WWW. A Portret of the World with Heidegger / Andrei Vartic. – Chişinău: Ed. Basarabia, 1999. - 296  p.
  * * * 
Vartic, Andrei. Limbă şi geopolitică la poporul de est al poporului Român: [Pref.] / Andrei Vartic // Nuţă, Ion. Limbă şi cultură românească în Basarabia / Ion Nuţă; pref. Andrei Vartic. – Bacău, Ed. Vicovia, 2007. –P. 5-22.
Vartic, Andrei. Supravieţuire prin memorie: [Prefaţă] / Andrei Vartic // Bobeică Constantin. : [Publicistică, eseuri] / Constantin Bobeică; pref. Andrei Vartic. – Chişinău: Ed. Prometeu, 2006. – P. 5-8.
  * * * 
Andrei Vartic: [Fişă bibliogr.] // Vartic, Andrei. Cealaltă Românie: [Publicistică] / Andrei Vartic. – Ploieşti: Casa de presă Typodas Press, 2007. – (P. 4 a cop.).
Marinescu, Ioan. Despre Andrei Vartic, în şapte rânduri // Vartic, Andrei. Cealaltă Românie: [Publicistică] / Andrei Vartic. – Ploieşti: Casa de presă Typodas Press, 2007. – 384 p.
Rău, Alexe. O carte scrisă la munte / Alexe Rău // Vartic, Andrei. Întrebarea cu privire la paleoinformatică / Andrei Vartic; pref. Alexe Rău. – Chişinău, Ed. BNRM. -  P.3-7.
Ţau, Elena. Vartic, Andrei (21.X.1948, Dănceni, Chişinău) / Elena Ţau // Dicţionarul scriitorilor români din Basarabia. 1812-2006. – Chişinău: Prut Internaţional, 2007. – P. 462-463/

References

Bibliography 
 Articol de Vlad Pohilă publicat în Calendar Naţional 2008 / Biblioteca Naţională a Republicii Moldova. -- Chişinău: Ed. BNRM, 2008. -- P.343-347.

External links 
 Despre viaţa lui Andrei Vartic

 

1948 births
2009 deaths
Moldova State University alumni
Moldovan writers
Moldovan male writers
People from Ialoveni District
Moldovan MPs 1990–1994
Moldovan physicists